About That Life is a 2019 Dutch drama film directed by Shady El-Hamus. The film is his feature directorial debut. In July 2019, it was shortlisted as one of the nine films in contention to be the Dutch entry for the Academy Award for Best International Feature Film at the 92nd Academy Awards, but it was not selected.

Cast
 Bilal Wahib as Bilal
 Daniel Kolf as Gregg
 Oussama Ahammoud as Kev
 Vera Bulder as Liv

Production
In September 2018, it was announced that rapper Hef, Bilal Wahib and Daniel Kolf were added to the cast. Principal photography took place in the summer of 2018.

References

External links
 

2019 films
2019 drama films
Dutch drama films
2010s Dutch-language films